Cycle is a 2018 Marathi film directed by Prakash Kunte. The film is produced by Sangram Surve and Amar Pandit and written by Aditi Moghe. The original soundtrack has been composed by Aditya Bedekar.

Synopsis
Keshav is a well-known astrologer and doctor who lives with his father, wife and daughter. Keshav's grandfather had obtained a yellow bicycle from an Englishman and had bequeathed it to his grandson prior to his death. Keshav is possessive of his cycle, and the only one who he lets ride it is his daughter. One day, his daughter enquires whether or not the cycle will ever get bored and fly away. One night two thieves steal his cycle to escape. Keshav is distressed and sets out in search of his cycle.

The thieves pose themselves as Keshav's cousins and tour around nearby villages. Wherever they go, they are honored by people for their relation with Keshav. Keshav's journey teaches him to not be so attached to worldly possessions. The guilt-ridden thieves decide to renounce their activities and return all stolen goods. They write a letter to Keshav, expressing their respect for him and also return the cycle. Keshav realises his folly and gifts the cycle to a boy. He returns home, realising the true meaning of joy. When he returns, he finds that everyone in his village has pitched in and made him a new cycle, which they pretend is his old one. He rubs the cycle and finds fresh paint on his fingers. He then smiles, gesturing to his daughter that the cycle has flown away.

Cast
 Hrishikesh Joshi as Keshav, an astrologer
 Bhalchandra Kadam as Gajya, a thief
 Priyadarshan Jadhav as Mangya, a thief
 Deepti Lele as Jayashree, Keshav's wife

 Vidhyadhar Joshi as Savkar
 Abhijeet Chavan as Shyam, Keshav's friend who owns a small restaurant but aspires to become an actor
 Baby Mythili Patwardhan as Keshav's daughter
 Manoj Kolhatkar as Keshav's father

Reception 
It was one of the three Marathi films screened at the Cannes Film Festival in 2017. It won best film, best director, best screenplay, and best actor awards at the Kolhapur International Film festival. It also won the National Film Award for Best Costume Design. It was a resounding success at the box office, with Cinestaan calling it a blockbuster.

References

External links 
 

2010s Marathi-language films
Films scored by Rohan-Rohan